The Pine Bluff Street Historic District encompasses a well-preserved residential area of Malvern, Arkansas, that was developed between about 1890 and 1940.  It extends along Pine Bluff Street, just east of the city center, between Gloster Court and McNeal Street.  Most of the houses in this area are American Craftsman style bungalows, although the district is also home to one of Arkansas' finest Second Empire houses, the Bratt-Lea House at 225 Pine Bluff Street.  The district was listed on the National Register of Historic Places in 1999, and includes two previously-listed properties: the Gatewood House, and the Alderson-Coston House.

See also
National Register of Historic Places listings in Hot Spring County, Arkansas

References

Colonial Revival architecture in Arkansas
Buildings and structures in Malvern, Arkansas
Historic districts on the National Register of Historic Places in Arkansas
National Register of Historic Places in Hot Spring County, Arkansas
Houses in Hot Spring County, Arkansas
Bungalow architecture in Arkansas
American Craftsman architecture in Arkansas
Second Empire architecture in Arkansas